The 1977 Belgian Grand Prix was a Formula One motor race held at Zolder on 5 June 1977. It was the seventh race of the 1977 World Championship of F1 Drivers and the 1977 International Cup for F1 Constructors.

The 70-lap race was won by Swedish driver Gunnar Nilsson, driving a Lotus-Ford. Austrian driver Niki Lauda finished second in a Ferrari, while Nilsson's fellow Swede, Ronnie Peterson, finished third in the six-wheeled Tyrrell-Ford. This was to be Nilsson's only Formula One victory, before his career was cut short by cancer and he died in October 1978.

Qualifying

Qualifying classification

Race

Report
In qualifying Mario Andretti took a comfortable pole position with John Watson just beating the second Lotus of Gunnar Nilsson to second. The race was wet due to rain earlier in the day. Watson took the lead into the first corner, but later in the lap, Andretti locked up into the chicane and ran into the back of the Brabham, knocking both drivers out of the race with Jody Scheckter taking over the lead.

Scheckter led the early stages ahead of Nilsson, whereas Carlos Reutemann made an early charge but spun off. The track began to dry and everyone had to pit for tyres, and those who stopped early were the ones who benefited, as now Niki Lauda was leading from Jochen Mass and Scheckter was down to fifth. Mass spun off from second, handing it to Nilsson who then went on to catch and pass Lauda before driving away to his first career victory. Behind second-placed Lauda, Ronnie Peterson completed the podium for Team Tyrrell after Scheckter retired with an engine failure. This remains the only F1 race in which two Swedes shared the podium.

David Purley stayed out later than most drivers and was running third by lap 21. After he finally pitted, he emerged in front of race leader Lauda. He was likely unaware that Lauda was a lap ahead and did not let him through, holding the leader up for a few laps. This may have cost Lauda victory and the two were involved in an argument after the race.

Classification

Championship standings after the race

Drivers' Championship standings

Constructors' Championship standings

References

Belgian Grand Prix
Belgian Grand Prix
Grand Prix
Circuit Zolder